Nawab Sirajul Islam (1845-1923) was a Bengali lawyer during the British rule of India, a Muslim activist, and education reformer.

Early life 
Islam was born in 1845 in the village of Pearakandi, in what is now Nabinagar Upazila, Brahmanbaria District. In 1867, he graduated from Dhaka College.

Career 
Islam joined the Pogose School as an assistant headmaster. 

Islam became a Calcutta High Court lawyer after completing his law degree in 1873. He became the assistant secretary of the Central National Muhamedan Association. In 1875, he was elected commissioner of the Calcutta Municipality. In 1887, the British Raj awarded him the title of Khan Bahadur. He was a support of Begum Rokeya and her campaign for the education of Muslim women.

Islam was a member of the Bengal Legislative Council from 1893 to 1902. He was a member of the syndicate body of the Calcutta University. He had opposed the partition of Bengal in 1905 but later changed his mind. He initially opposed the University of Dhaka. Islam was awarded the title Nawab in 1911.

Death 
Islam died in 1923 in Kolkata, West Bengal. His family collection was donated to the University of Dhaka Library. Nawab Sirajul Islam Lane in Kolkata is named after him.

References 

1845 births
1923 deaths
People from Brahmanbaria district
Bengali lawyers
Bengali educators
Bengali activists
19th-century Bengalis
Bengali Muslims
Activists from West Bengal
Indian activists
Indian lawyers